Shamsabad is a town and a municipal board in Agra district in the Indian state of Uttar Pradesh.

Geography
It has an average elevation of 165 metres (541 feet).

Demographics
As of 2011 Indian Census, Shamsabad had a total population of 33,144, of which 17,433 were males and 15,711 were females. Population within the age group of 0 to 6 years was 5,187. The total number of literates in Shamsabad was 18,838, which constituted 56.8% of the population with male literacy of 63.1% and female literacy of 49.9%. The effective literacy rate of 7+ population of Shamsabad was 67.4%, of which male literacy rate was 75.0% and female literacy rate was 59.0%. The Scheduled Castes population was 5,005. Shamsabad had 4938 households in 2011.

 India census, Shamsabad had a population of 27,260. Males constitute 53% of the population and females 47%. Shamsabad has an average literacy rate of 52%, lower than the national average of 59.5%: male literacy is 60%, and female literacy is 42%. In Shamsabad, 18% of the population is under 6 years of age.

References

Cities and towns in Agra district
Agra district